Johnny Foreigner are an indie rock four-piece from Birmingham, UK, consisting of guitarist and lead vocalist Alexei Berrow, bassist and vocalist Kelly Parker (née Southern), drummer Junior Elvis Washington Laidley, and guitarist and visual artist Lewes Herriot.

The band released six albums, beginning with a self-release in 2005 and their full-studio debut Waited Up 'til It Was Light in 2008. They were last active in 2016, releasing the record Mono No Aware, touring it, and performing their final show at a Christmas gig in Leicester. Frontman Alexei Berrow announced the project had been halted in mid-2020, but that the act may release future material. The band announced new activities in July 2021.

History
Before the band formed, Berrow and Parker both played in different outfits, Panda Love Unit, Twist and Autolight.

Johnny Foreigner formed in December 2005 in Birmingham, consisting of lead vocalist Alexei Berrow, drummer Junior Elvis Washington Laidley and bassist Daniel Boyle. Berrow described the band as "a country band with pretensions". This original line-up self-produced and released their first album We Left You Sleeping and Gone Now in 2005 in a hand-made edition of 40 copies.

After the release of the album, Boyle left Johnny Foreigner for Gentle Friendly, and was replaced with bassist and vocalist Kelly Parker. The band released their first single, "Sometimes in the Bullring" in October 2006

The second single, released 21 May 2007, was a split with fellow Birmingham act Sunset Cinema Club and contained the track Yes! You Talk Too Fast, as well as a cover of Sunset Cinema Clubs Ninki. vs Dingle, whilst Sunset Cinema Club covered Johnny Foreigner's Candles

After signing to Best Before Records in 2007, the band issued the EP Arcs Across The City in November of that year. The EP was rated 10/10 by Drowned in Sound.

Later in 2007 Johnny Foreigner recorded their debut album Waited Up 'til It Was Light in Hoboken, New Jersey, during which they also gave their first live performance in the United States, supporting Delaware's Spinto Band and Cardiff-based indie pop band Los Campesinos! at the Bowery Ballroom in New York on 30 November 2007. Leading up to the release of the album, the band released the songs Our Bipolar Friends and Eyes Wide Terrified from the album as singles on 10 March 2008 and 18 May 2008. The album itself was released on 2 June 2008. On 12 January 2009 Lea Room was released as a single as well.

In addition to the commercially available releases, Johnny Foreigner packaged 15 demos in July 2007 and made them available for free download under the title I Like You Mostly Late at Never.

On 30 March 2009, while on tour supporting Hundred Reasons, Berrow announced that the band had finished recording their second album and it would be coming out later that year. Their second album Grace and the Bigger Picture was released through Best Before Records on 26 October.

On 10 September 2010, the band announced their departure from Best Before and arrival to Alcopop! Records.  Their first release Alcopop! was the EP You thought you saw a shooting star but yr eyes were blurred with tears and that lighthouse can be pretty deceiving with the sky so clear and sea so calm, which at one point was titled There When You Need It.

The band undertook their first North American tour in October 2010, supporting Los Campesinos! mostly along the eastern seaboard. To fund the tour, the band re-issued We Left You Sleeping and Gone Now (with ...also added to the title) and Everyday Is a Constant Battle with bonus tracks. They also released a bootleg of them supporting Los Campesinos! at the London Garage on 15 July 2010 filmed by Dan Gardner.

On 13 March 2011 the band's song "Absolute Balance", from their debut album, appeared on episode 10 of the HBO series, "Shameless."

The EP Certain Songs Are Cursed was released on Alcopop! in April 2011 as a limited-edition CD attached to the underside of a frisbee.  In September 2011, the single (Don't) Show Us Your Fangs / The Hand That Slaps You Back was released digitally with the option of stickers promoting the upcoming album.

Their 17-track third album Johnny Foreigner vs Everything was released on CD/MP3 on 7 November 2011. A double vinyl release was released on 16 July 2012, which features three additional songs from the Certain Songs are Cursed EP and two B-sides on the fourth side.

In late April 2012 as a prelude to the festival season, the band announced the addition of their visual artist Lewes Herriot as second guitarist.

On 1 October 2012, the band announced the late October release of a new EP, Names, on Alcopop! in the UK and Chicago-based Swerp Records in the U.S. The EP was released as a digital download, with the Alcopop! version coming with a set of badges, and the Swerp version a T-shirt. An accompanying tour of the eastern and midwestern United States was also announced with Canadian dates to follow.

Johnny Foreigner released their fourth album, You Can Do Better, on 10 March 2014. This was followed by a 15-date UK tour, supported by Radstewart. The album received a score of 66 on Metacritic, indicating generally favorable reviews. The album was praised for its consistency, and the addition of Herriot as an additional guitarist was received well.

On 21 July 2014, Philadelphia label Lame-O Records announced that it had signed the band for the United States and that a mixtape of re-recorded B-sides and demos, Worse Things Happen at Sea, would be released online the following day. Lame-O released You Can Do Better in a vinyl pressing of 500 (100 clear, 400 cherry red) on 19 August 2014.

The band announced their fifth album on 13 June 2016, titled Mono No Aware. It was released on 8 July via Alcopop! Records.

In July 2021 following a five-year hiatus, Johnny Foreigner announced a one-off 15th anniversary show in London for 2 October, a vinyl reissue of Waited Up 'til It Was Light, and plans for new music.

Discography

Albums
WeLeftYouSleepingAndGoneNow - Self-Released (2005)
Waited Up 'til It Was Light - Best Before Records/Nettwerk (North America) (2008)
Grace and the Bigger Picture - Best Before Records (2009)
Johnny Foreigner vs Everything - Alcopop! Records (2011)
You Can Do Better - Alcopop! Records (2014)
Mono No Aware - Alcopop! Records (2016)

EPs
Arcs Across the City - Best Before Records (2007)
Feels Like Summer - Best Before Records (2009)
Every Cloakroom Ever - Self Released (2010)
Johnnyforeignerisaces (Hearts Edition) - Self Released (2010)
You Thought You Saw a Shooting Star but Yr Eyes Were Blurred With Tears and That Lighthouse Can Be Pretty Deceiving With the Sky So Clear and Sea So Calm - Alcopop! Records (2010)
There When You Need It (2010 non-album tracks) - Self Released (2011)
Certain Songs are Cursed - Alcopop! Records (2011)
You vs Everything - Alcopop! Records (2011)
Names - Alcopop! Records/Swerp Records (2012)
Manhattan Projects (alternate/acoustic versions) - Self Release (2013)
The X and the O EP - Alcopop! Records (2016)

Singles
Sometimes in the Bullring/Camp Kelly Calm - Laundrette Recording Company (2007)
Yes! You Talk Too Fast/Ninki vs. Dingle (split 7-inch w/Sunset Cinema Club) - Laundrette Recording Company (2007)
Our Bipolar Friends/The Houseparty Scene Is Killing You - Best Before Records (2008)
Eyes Wide Terrified - Best Before Records (2008)
Salt, Peppa and Spinderella - Best Before Records (2008)
Cranes and Cranes and Cranes and Cranes - New Slang Records (2008)
DJ's Get Doubts/Lea Room - Best Before Records (2009)
Feels Like Summer - Best Before Records (2009)
Criminals - Best Before Records (2009)
(Don't) Show Us Your Fangs / The Hand That Slaps You Back - Alcopop! Records (2011)
If you Can't Be Honest, Be Awesome/A Good Man Is Hard to Find (2016)

Split
 Johnny Foreigner / Stagecoach (Split with Stagecoach) (2010)
Alcopop! vs. Dog Knights Productions 4-Way Split - Johnny Foreigner (All Yr Favourite Bands Are Dead/Flooding), Doe, Doctrines, Playlounge

Demos/Bootlegs
Everyday is a Constant Battle - Self Released (2006)
I Like You Mostly Late at Never - Self Released (2007)
Live at Wichiten - Self Released (2010)

Mixtapes
Worse Things Happen at Sea - Lame-O Records (2014)

Compilations
European Disco - Collected B-sides, and Remixes, 2008 - 2010 - Self Released (2011)

Members 
Current Members
Alexei Berrow - Guitar & Lead Vocals (2005–present)
Kelly Parker- Bass & Lead Vocals (2006–present)
Junior Elvis Washington Laidley - Drums & Backing Vocals (2005–present)
Lewes Herriot - Guitar & Backing Vocals (2012–present)

Former Members
Daniel Boyle - Bass (2005–2006)

Timeline

References

External links

Official Website

English indie rock groups
Musical groups from Birmingham, West Midlands
Best Before Records artists
Alcopop! Records artists
Lame-O Records artists